Madeeh ( madīḥ) is a song-like recitation of Islamic poetry praising Allah and the Islamic prophet Muhammad. Ethnomusicologist Artur Simon described madeeh as "praise, praise poem, glorification and, in this context, praise hymn in honour of Allah and Muhammad. It is usually recited by one male performer or a small group of men and may be accompanied by hand clapping or traditional hand drums.

Religious practice in Islamic societies 
The poetic lyrics of madeeh typically express emotional religiosity akin to Sufi rituals or moral religious concepts. Usually they are performed in private celebrations or public festivities, such as the mawlid-an-Nabi, but may also be heard in the alleys of traditional markets.

Similar in religious expression, madeeh is different from the communal performance of dhikr recitations. Other forms of group performances in the musical culture of Sudan, Egypt and other communities in East Africa or the Middle East are called zār or tambura and are performed by women only.

See also
 Sufism
 Music of Sudan

References

Further reading 

 Simon, Artur (ed.) (1998). Ḏikr und Madīḥ: islamische Gesänge und Zeremonien im Sudan, Museum Collection Berlin 22 and 23, [2 CDs, incl. notes by A. Simon]
 Zenkovsky, S. (1950). ‘Zar and Tambura as practised by the women of Omdurman’, Sudan Notes and Records, 31, pp. 65–85

Sufi music